is a Japanese professional footballer who plays as a defensive midfielder for Lao Premier League club Young Elephants.

Career statistics

Club

Notes

References

1993 births
Living people
Japanese footballers
Japanese expatriate footballers
Association football midfielders
Kanto Gakuin University alumni
Athletic 220 players
Lao Toyota F.C. players
Yangon United F.C. players
Persiraja Banda Aceh players
Lao Premier League players
Myanmar National League players
Liga 1 (Indonesia) players
Expatriate footballers in Laos
Japanese expatriate sportspeople in Laos
Expatriate footballers in Mongolia
Japanese expatriate sportspeople in Mongolia
Expatriate footballers in Myanmar
Japanese expatriate sportspeople in Myanmar
Expatriate footballers in Indonesia
Japanese expatriate sportspeople in Indonesia